Pandulf Masca or Pandolfo Masca  is a name of Pisan origin often used erroneously to refer to:
Pandolfo da Lucca (died ?1210), cardinal from 1182
Pandulf Verraccio (died 1226), papal legate to England